Médéa is a province (wilaya) of Algeria. The capital is Médéa.

Administrative divisions
The province is divided into 19 districts (daïras), which are further divided into 64 communes or municipalities.

Districts

 Aïn Boucif
 Aziz
 Béni Slimane
 Berrouaghia
 Chahbounia
 Chellalat El Adhaoura
 El Azizia
 El Omaria
 Guelb El Kébir
 Ksar El Boukhari
 Médéa
 Ouamri
 Ouled Antar
 Ouzera
 Seghouane
 Si Mahdjoub
 Sidi Naâmane
 Souaghi
 Tablat

Communes

 Aïn Boucif
 Aïn Ou Ksir
 Aissaouia
 Aziz
 Baata
 Benchicao
 Beni Slimane
 Berrouaghia
 Bir Ben Laabed
 Boghar
 Bou Aiche
 Bouaichoune
 Bouchrahil
 Boughezoui
 Bouskene
 Chahbounia
 Chellalat El Adhaoura
 Cheniguel
 Damiat
 Derrag
 Deux Bassins
 Djouab
 Draa Essamar
 El Azizia
 El Guelbelkebir
 El Hamdania
 El Omaria
 El Ouinet
 Hannacha
 Kef Lakhdar
 Khams Djouamaa
 Ksar Boukhari
 Meghraoua
 Médéa
 Medjebar
 Meftaha
 Mezerana
 Mihoub
 Ouamri
 Oued Harbil
 Ouled
 Ouled Antar
 Ouled Brahim
 Ouled Deide
 Ouled Hellal
 Ouled Maaref
 Oum El Djalil
 Ouzera
 Rebaia
 Saneg
 Sedraia
 Seghouane
 Sidi Mahdjoub
 Sidi Damed
 Sidi Errabia
 Sidi Naamane
 Sidi Zahar
 Sidi Ziane
 Souagui
 Tablat
 Tafraout
 Tamesguida
 Tizi Mahdi
 Tlatet Eddouair
 Zoubiria

Notable people
 Mohamed Belhocine (born 1951), Algerian medical scientist, professor of internal medicine and epidemiology.

References

 
Provinces of Algeria
1962 establishments in Algeria
States and territories established in 1962